Moorhouse is a village on the B5307 road in the civil parish of Burgh by Sands in the Carlisle district, in the English county of Cumbria. It is near the city of Carlisle. In 1870–72 the township had a population of 306. It has a pub called 'The Royal Oak Inn'.

See also

Listed buildings in Burgh by Sands

References

External links
  Cumbria County History Trust: Burgh-by-Sands (nb: provisional research only - see Talk page)

Villages in Cumbria
Burgh by Sands